Danny Spanos (also known as George Spannos) was an American rock drummer, best known for his 1983 EP "Passion in the Dark" which produced the Mainstream Rock Tracks hit single "Hot Cherie" in Mainstream Rock chart in the summer of 1983. He also had songs on the soundtracks of 2 movies in 1983–84, Up the Creek used his song "Passion in the Dark", and the Tom Cruise movie All the Right Moves used his song "This Could Be Our Last Chance".

Born and raised in South Lyon, Michigan, he played drums with several groups, including Redbone, known best for their hit song "Come and Get Your Love" in the 1970s. He also played drums on the theme music for the 1970s TV series Starsky and Hutch.

Danny Spanos was arrested in 1984. He also released "Looks Like Trouble" in 1984, which had disappointing sales, and the only single released "I'd Lie To You For Your Love" received little airplay, and was later turned into a country hit by The Bellamy Brothers.

He had a video for the song "Excuse Me" from "Passion in the Dark" which made it into the MTV video rotation in early 1983.

Discography

Studio albums

Singles

References

External links
Official Redbone website

American rock drummers
Musicians from Michigan
Living people
Year of birth missing (living people)
People from South Lyon, Michigan